Bruna Alves de Carvalho (born São Paulo, Brazil, April 16, 2000) is a Brazilian actress, the daughter of Angelica Celina Fernandes and Sérgio Carvalho. Following early appearances in commercials, her first major role was as Lara FIel in the soap opera Amor e Revolution in 2011. She gained further prominence in 2012 playing Nina in the telenovela Carousel.

From 2013 through 2015, she appeared as Isabel in the remake of the children's soap opera Chiquititas, adapted by Iris Abravanel and aired by SBT. She has also appeared in the Youtube video series Rota (Route) 50 15, in which she and companion Rogério Enachev travel the world.

Filmography

Reference

External links 
Bruna Carvalho on IMDB.

Actors from São Paulo (state)
2000 births
Living people